Gamma Sigma Fraternity International, initially founded as a literary society in  in Brockport, NY, is known as the first international high school fraternity. The organization no longer has active chapters at the secondary level; however, it has an active alumni association based in the Greater Toronto Area and in the Niagara Region, Ontario, Canada.

History 
Charles McLean was the principal for the first several decades of the normal school and helped establish one of the major elements of the school's culture, its Greek Letter Societies.

The society formed chapters at other schools, both normal and high schools. It was the Eta chapter. 

By , Gamma Sigma Fraternity had 26 chapters in eight states and the District of Columbia.

On , Gamma Sigma Fraternity International alumni gathered in Niagara Falls, Ontario, Canada to celebrate the 150th anniversary of the organization. It had been 150 years to the day, since its founding.

References

External links
Gamma Sigma Fraternity International Facebook Group

Literary societies
High school fraternities and sororities
Student organizations established in 1869